Hellsinki is a 2009 Finnish film directed by Aleksi Mäkelä. The film is based on the novel Rööperi – rikoksen vuodet 1955–2005 by Harri Nykänen and Tom Sjöberg. Hellsinki follows the journey of two criminals, Tomppa and Krisu, in Punavuori (in slang Rööperi), a neighbourhood in Helsinki, from the mid-1960s to the late 1970s.

Cast 
 Samuli Edelmann as Tomppa
 Peter Franzén as Krisu
 Pihla Viitala as Monika
 Kari Hietalahti as Gypsy Kari
 Juha Veijonen as Koistinen
 Jasper Pääkkönen as Korppu
 Kristo Salminen as Arska
 Pekka Valkeejärvi as Uki
 Hiski Grönstrand as Pera
 Tommi Rantamäki as Sale
 Santeri Kinnunen as Teukka
 Kalle Holmberg as Lindström
 Leena Uotila as Tomppa's mother
 Pirkko Mannola as Tyyne, Kari's mother

References

External links 
 

2009 films
Films shot in Finland
Films shot in Helsinki
Films set in Helsinki
Films directed by Aleksi Mäkelä
2009 crime drama films
Films set in the 1960s
Films set in the 1970s
Films based on Finnish novels
Finnish crime drama films
2000s Finnish-language films